"Whoa" is a song by American rapper Earl Sweatshirt and the second single from his debut studio album Doris. It was released on March 12, 2013, by Tan Cressida and Columbia Records. It is featuring and produced by Tyler, The Creator. It was recorded at Paramount Recording Studios in Hollywood, California.

Music video 

The music video was released on March 11, 2013 on the official Odd Future YouTube channel. It was directed by Tyler, The Creator's alter-ego Wolf Haley. It currently has over 27 million views as of November 2020.

Personnel 

 Earl Sweatshirt – performer, writer, 
 Tyler, The Creator – performer, writer, producer
 Vic Wainstein – engineer
 Jaycen Joshua – engineer
 Dave Kutch – engineer

References 

2013 singles
2013 songs
Songs written by Tyler, the Creator
Songs written by Earl Sweatshirt